Moładava - is a township in Ivanava District of Brest Region in Belarus.

History 
On March 11, 2011, presidential decree "On the establishment of official heraldic symbols of administrative-territorial and territorial units of the Brest region" adopted emblem and flag of the village.

References

External links 
 Moładava at Radzima.org

Populated places in Brest Region
Brest Litovsk Voivodeship
Brestsky Uyezd
Polesie Voivodeship